Mrkonjić is a Serbo-Croatian surname. It may refer to:

People
Petar Mrkonjić (mid-17th century), legendary brigand in Dalmatia
Peter I of Serbia (1844–1921), nom de guerre Petar Mrkonjić, King of Serbia
Milutin Mrkonjić (born 1942), Serbian politician
Braća Mrkonjić, music duo
Novak Mrkonjić

Toponyms
Mrkonjić Grad, a town and municipality in western Bosnia and Herzegovina

See also
Mrkonjići, a town in southern Bosnia and Herzegovina
Mrkonje, a village in southern Serbia

Serbian surnames
Croatian surnames